Russian nobility and royalty may refer to:
 Russian royalty
 Russian nobility